Oxford Terrace Baptist Church is located in the Christchurch Central City on a prominent corner property fronting the Avon River. The original building was significantly damaged in the 2010 Canterbury earthquake and collapsed in the subsequent February 2011 Christchurch earthquake. This building had a Category II listing by the New Zealand Historic Places Trust. A new building was opened on Christmas Eve 2017.

History

The Christchurch Baptist church was founded in 1863 by 19 settlers from England. Decimus Dolamore, who was instrumental for establishing the Baptist faith in New Zealand, was the first minister. The congregation first met in the town hall in High Street. In 1864, a church was built in Lichfield Street opposite where the Bus Exchange is located (as of 2011). The congregation split in 1867, but reunited in 1870 and built a church in Hereford Street. The congregation decided to build larger premises and purchased land for £1,325 on the corner of Oxford Terrace and Madras Street, overlooking the Avon River.

A design competition was won by local architect Edward J. Saunders. The congregation decided, though, that the total costs of the project was beyond their means. As an interim measure, the Hereford Street church was transported to the new site. Much public amusement was caused when the church sat on a wagon next to ChristChurch Cathedral for a weekend in 1879. Three weeks after arriving at the new site, the building was damaged by fire, but opened again some months later. The older building was in use until 1903, when it once again caught fire.

Tenders for the new church were called for in August 1881, but the prices submitted were too high, ranging from £3,956 to £5,337. A revised tender in September 1881 received a quote of £3,130 by Morey and McHale, which was accepted. The Reverend C. Dallaston laid the foundation stone on 14 October 1881 and the project was completed and opened to the public on 9 July 1882. At that point, it was the largest Baptist church in the country. An organ was imported from England and installed in 1915.

The main building was significantly damaged in the 4 September 2010 earthquake and collapsed in the subsequent 22 February 2011 earthquake. It was demolished in late June 2011 following further collapse in the 13 June 2011 earthquake.

Heritage listing

On 10 September 2004, the church was registered by the New Zealand Historic Places Trust as a Category II historic place, with the registration number being 1853. It is significant for its Neoclassical architecture, which is unusual for Christchurch. The church had the last remaining temple frontage in the city.

Peter Beck, the dean of ChristChurch Cathedral, lists the Oxford Terrace Baptist Church as one of the "iconic churches of the city".

Post-earthquake

The former site of the church of the church was used for a temporary art installation by Peter Majendie, unveiled at the first anniversary of the February 2011 earthquake. The installation, called Reflection of Loss of Lives, Livelihoods and Living in Neighbourhood, used 185 chairs all painted in white but of different shapes, reflecting the different personalities of those who died. The artwork became known as 185 empty chairs. Within a year, the installation moved to a different site, and in 2017, discussions started to make the artwork permanent.

In March 2016, The Press revealed that a modern replacement church had gained resource consent. The NZ$8.5m project will create a two-storey building with an auditorium for 250 people; NZ$1.5m has yet to be fund-raised. The church was reopened on Christmas Eve 2017.

References

Religious buildings and structures in Christchurch
Heritage New Zealand Category 2 historic places in Canterbury, New Zealand
Churches completed in 1882
19th-century Baptist churches
Buildings and structures demolished as a result of the 2011 Christchurch earthquake
Former churches in New Zealand
Christianity in Christchurch
Listed churches in New Zealand
1880s architecture in New Zealand
Baptist churches in New Zealand
Neoclassical church buildings in New Zealand
Stone churches in New Zealand